"L.S.F." (or "L.S.F. (Lost Souls Forever)") is the second single released by the British rock group Kasabian.  It was the band's first UK Top 10 hit, peaking at No. 10 and staying in the Top 75 for five weeks. The song also charted in the United States, peaking at No. 32 on Billboard's Alternative Songs chart.

In May 2007, NME magazine placed "LSF" at number 37 in its list of the 50 Greatest Indie Anthems Ever.

The drums on this track are played by Daniel Ralph Martin, who also played drums on "Cutt Off", as permanent drummer Ian Matthews did not join until midway through the album's recording sessions. Lead guitarist Christopher Karloff fills in as the drummer in the UK music video. The US music video features all five members at the time and is their only video to do so besides "Processed Beats".

Background 

According to The Telegraph, the song is "articulating a mood of fear and paranoia surrounding terrorism and the Iraq war, with its chorus couplet of 'We got our backs to the wall / Watch out, they're gonna kill us all.'"

In 2006, bassist Chris Edwards said, "The first LP had military imagery because we were writing it as shit was happening abroad with the army. You’d go down the shops and see ‘THE TROOPS ARE ON FIRE’ in the paper and Serge wrote the lyrics and took influence from this. We weren’t for it or against. We just wrote about what was going on."

About this song, guitarist Serge Pizzorno said,

Reception

The Austin Chronicle said, "Both 'L.S.F. (Lost Souls Forever)' and the sweeping 'U Boat' feel stadium-ready, with massive backswells of low-end punch overlaid with Tom Meighan's monotonic snarl and Sergio Pizzorno's swirling guitars and electronics."

Track listing

Maxi CD
PARADISE14
 L.S.F. – 3:19
 Lab Twat – 3:17
 Doctor Zapp – 3:32
 L.S.F. (Jagz Kooner Mix Edit) — 3:14
 CD-Rom with L.S.F video

Mini CD
PARADISE13
 L.S.F. – 3:19
 L.S.F. (Jagz Kooner Mix Edit) – 3:14

Japan CD
BVCP-29045
 L.S.F. – 3:21
 Lab Twat – 3:20
 Doctor Zapp – 3:34
 L.S.F. (Jagz Kooner Mix Edit) — 3:13
 Club Foot (Live in Tokyo at Summer Sonic Festival, 8 August 2004) – 4:12
 CD-Rom with L.S.F video

10" vinyl
PARADISE15
 L.S.F. (Album version) – 3:14
 Club Foot (Live @ Cabinet War Rooms) – 4:14
 L.S.F. (Jagz Kooner Mix - Full Version) – 7:06

Personnel
 Tom Meighan – lead vocals
 Sergio Pizzorno – backing vocals, guitar, synths
 Christopher Karloff – lead guitar, synths, omnichord
 Chris Edwards – bass guitar
 Daniel Ralph Martin – drums
 Damian Taylor – programming

Covers
 Mark Ronson covered L.S.F. on his album Version featuring Kasabian themselves.
 The industrial band Goteki covered L.S.F. on its Stolen Thunder One EP.

Charts

Certifications

References

2004 singles
2004 songs
Columbia Records singles
Kasabian songs
Mark Ronson songs
Song recordings produced by Jim Abbiss
Songs written by Christopher Karloff
Songs written by Sergio Pizzorno